The Athénée Louisianais (est. 1876) was a francophone literary society in New Orleans, Louisiana. Founding members were P. G. T. Beauregard, Oliver Carrière, Paul Fourchy, J. G. Hava, Auguste Jas, Sabin Martin, Armand Mercier, Léona Queyrouze, and Charles Turpin. It published a magazine, Comptes-Rendus de l'Athénée Louisianais, and began an essay contest in 1878. Around 1913 the group operated from headquarters in the Hibernia Bank Building on Gravier Street. As of 1929 it belonged to the Fédération de l'Alliance française.

See also

 Francophone literature
 Literature of Louisiana
 Louisiana French
 French Louisiana

References

Bibliography
 . 1876-1921

External links
 
Records of Athénée Louisianais at The Historic New Orleans Collection

1876 establishments in Louisiana
Clubs and societies in the United States
Culture of New Orleans
Organizations established in 1876
French-American culture in Louisiana
French-language culture